Erik Persson (born 12 January 1994) is a Swedish swimmer. He competed in the men's 100 metre breaststroke event at the 2016 Summer Olympics. He qualified to represent Sweden at the 2020 Summer Olympics in the men's 200 metre breaststroke event.

References

External links
 

1994 births
Living people
Olympic swimmers of Sweden
Swimmers at the 2016 Summer Olympics
Place of birth missing (living people)
Swedish male breaststroke swimmers
European Aquatics Championships medalists in swimming
Swimmers at the 2020 Summer Olympics
World Aquatics Championships medalists in swimming